List of Chinese composers by surname:

 Chen Gang - (born 1935)
 Chen Qigang - (born 1951)
 Chen Yi - (born 1953) first Chinese female composer to receive a Master of Arts from the Central Conservatory of Music.
 Chou Wen-chung - (1923–2019) noted protogé and longtime professor at Columbia University.
 Du Mingxin - (born 1923)
 Du Yun - (born 1977)
 Ge Gan-ru - (born 1954)
 Jian'er Zhu - (1922-2017)
 Huang Ruo - (born 1976)
 Lei Liang - (born 1972)
 Liu Sola - (born 1955)
 Jing Jing Luo - (born 1953)
 Ma Sicong - (1912–1987)
 Qu Xiaosong - (born 1952)
 Bright Sheng - (born 1955) professor at University of Michigan
 Su Cong - (born 1957)
 Tan Dun - (born 1957)
 Wang Xilin - (born 1937)
 Xian Xinghai - (1905–1945)
 Ye Xiaogang - (born 1955)
 Zhou Long - (born 1953)
 Yang Jing - (born 1963)

Chinese
Composers